Scott William Rudmann is a British-American entrepreneur and investor. He is the founder of Nectar Capital and co-founder of the GLORY World Series global kickboxing league.

Career 
Rudmann spent three years as a business analyst at McKinsey & Company, based out of Los Angeles, San Francisco, and Buenos Aires, Argentina, and joined Deutsche Bank as an investment banker. He covered European clients in publishing, television, radio, music, and the Internet.

In 2002, Rudmann founded Nectar Capital, an asset management firm, where he serves as the managing partner and CIO of the company. He serves on the board of several Nectar portfolio companies, including United Fitness Brands and Phoenix Immersive (owner of the Da Vinci: Genius immersive art experiential show).

In 2010, along with Pierre Andurand, Rudmann, co-founded and vice-chairman of Glory Kickboxing, a global stand-up combat league that has executed over 84 events in 15 countries.The same year Rudmann was featured as one of the main characters in a play, "The Power of Yes," by David Hare, which had a six-month run at the Royal National Theatre in London. Professional thespian Peter Sullivan played the part of Rudmann. He is currently the main investor and shareholder of Renaissance Recordings.

Musical career 
Rudmann trained from an early age in classical music and later as a professional jazz saxophone player at Cal State Los Angeles before moving into a business career. Rudmann is a DJ performing under the moniker "Sirsax".

References 

Living people
American people of British descent
American company founders
Chief information officers
American jazz saxophonists